The 2011 European Shooting Championships were held in Belgrade, Serbia.

Men's events

Pistol

Rifle

300 m rifle

Running target

Shotgun

Women's events

Pistol

Rifle

300 m rifle

Shotgun

Men's Junior events

Women's Junior events

Medal summary

Seniors

Juniors

References

External links
 ESC Site
 Results

2011 in shooting sports
2011 in Serbian sport
2011
2011 European Shooting Championships
International sports competitions in Belgrade
Shooting competitions in Serbia
August 2011 sports events in Europe